Robert William "Bob" Dougherty (April 20, 1932May 12, 2006) was a professional American football linebacker in the National Football League (NFL) and the American Football League (AFL). He played for the NFL's Los Angeles Rams (1957) and Pittsburgh Steelers (1958), and the AFL's Oakland Raiders (1960–1963).

References

1932 births
2006 deaths
People from Bellevue, Kentucky
Players of American football from Kentucky
American football linebackers
Kentucky Wildcats football players
Cincinnati Bearcats football players
Oakland Raiders players
Los Angeles Rams players
Pittsburgh Steelers players
American Football League players